For No Good Reason is a 2012 American-British documentary film about Ralph Steadman, directed by Charlie Paul. The film was in competition for the Grierson Award for Best Documentary at the 2012 BFI London  Film Festival.

It premiered at the 2012 London Film Festival, and was released in 2014 in the United States.

Cast
 Ralph Steadman as himself
 Johnny Depp as himself
 Richard E. Grant as himself
 Terry Gilliam as himself
 Jann Wenner as himself
 Hunter S. Thompson as himself
 Hal Willner as himself
 Patrick Godfrey as Leonardo da Vinci (voice)

References

External links

 

2012 films
American documentary films
British documentary films
Biographical documentary films
Works about Hunter S. Thompson
Documentary films about visual artists
Sony Pictures Classics films
2010s English-language films
2010s American films
2010s British films